The 1977 Giro d'Italia was the 60th edition of the Giro d'Italia, one of cycling's Grand Tours. The field consisted of 140 riders, and 121 riders finished the race.

By rider

By nationality

References

1977 Giro d'Italia
1977